Galway Bohemians F.C. is an Irish association football club based in Galway. Their senior men's team competes in the Galway & District League. They have previously played in the Western League. The club was formed in 1932 and was originally put together as a representative team of a local youth league who wanted to enter a team in the FAI Youth Cup. In 1940–41 Galway Bohemians became the first club from Galway to reach the final of the FAI Junior Cup.  Together with Castlebar Celtic, Galway Bohemians hold the record for winning the Connacht Junior Cup the most times.

Honours
FAI Junior Cup
Runners Up: 1940–41: 1
Western League
Winners: 1936–37, 1937–38, 1939–40, 1946–47, 1960–61, 1967–68 : 6
Runners Up: 1966–67: 1
Connacht Junior Cup
Winners: 1938–39, 1945–46, 1952–53, 1955–56, 1969–70, 1971–72, 1977–78, 1992–93, 1996–97 : 9
Runners Up: 1941–42, : 1
Galway & District League
Winners: 1969–70, 1975–76: 2

References

Association football clubs in County Galway
Association football clubs established in 1932
Galway & District League teams
1932 establishments in Ireland
Association football clubs in Galway (city)